Wood Island is a former island in Marin County, California, formerly in the Corte Madera Creek (upstream of San Francisco Bay) but now surrounded by land. It appears in a 1954 USGS map of the region. In the 1960s, its principal owner was Spero Spiliotis. In 1969, the city of Larkspur passed a resolution of intent to annex the island, and in the 1970s, a ferry terminal had been proposed.

References

Islands of Marin County, California
Islands of Northern California
San Francisco Bay
Islands of San Francisco Bay